Margrethe von der Lippe (née Lund; 9 July 1913 – 10 March 1999) was a Norwegian ceramist.

Personal life 
She was born in Trondheim, a daughter of plumber Knut Henrik Holtermann Lund and Fredrikke Regine Brun. She married ceramist Jens von der Lippe in 1936.

Career 
Von der Lippe studied at the Norwegian National Academy of Craft and Art Industry and at the Staatliche Kunstgewerbeschule in Wien.
She ran a ceramics workshop in Oslo in cooperation with her husband, and many of their works were co-productions. She was awarded the Jacob Prize in 1970, jointly with her husband. Her works are represented in various museums in Norway.

References 

1913 births
1999 deaths
Norwegian ceramists
Norwegian women ceramists
People from Trondheim
20th-century ceramists